Anti-vampire burial has been discovered in Sanok, a city in the southern part Poland. By 1988, the remains of forty men have been discovered. Most of the remains had been partially destroyed.

The discovery 
This allegedly anti-vampire burial was discovered in 1986 during the demolition of the house number 20 in the Zamkowa Street in Sanok. It was one of forty burials discovered at this archaeological site. The excavations began in 1987 and ended one year later in 1988.

The research 
Partially destroyed grave (burial number 3a) was found in 1987 and contained remains of a young person, who had died at the age of less than 25 years. There was no burial goods and no wooden structures. The skeleton was incomplete, without some leg bones and right hand bones. The skull was between the femurs. The sex could not have been specified, because the skeleton had female as well as male sexual characteristics.

The burial was dated based on another piece of the site from the Zamkowa Street where some medieval pottery and modern coins had been found.

Probably indeterminate sex was the reason for that atypical burial. In those times, people tended to fear any abnormality and did not understand many health problems. They believed that the dead would not be able to return to life without their head.

Why anti-vampire? 
Anti-vampire burials are characterized by incomplete skeletons, lack of goods and no head or skulls located between legs. This type of burial was meant for people who did not belong to the society. Anti-vampire practices aimed to protect the living from a dangerous dead who could be considered for different disasters in the neighbourhood.

The identity 
Previously, it had been hypothesized that the dead could have been an executioner from Sanok. The executioner Jakub had been convicted of killing a man and of other crimes, and decapitated in 1564. This seems highly unlikely  because an executioner must be a strong man. The sex of the dead from grave 3a could not have been specified. Hence, the identity of the person from the anti-vampire burial is still unknown.

References

Sources 

 Kotowicz P. (2011), "Wampir" z ulicy Zamkowej 20 w Sanoku, Rocznik Sanocki, t. X, Sanok, s 33-65.
 Matczak M. (2014) Tak zwane pochówki antywampiryczne a zagadnienie zmian patologicznych. Próba reinterpretacji [w] Funeralia Lednickie spotkanie 16. Królowie i biskupi, rycerze i chłopi – identyfikacja zmarłych, red. Dzieduszycki Wojciech, Wrzesiński Jacek, Poznań, s. 437-457.
 Żydok P. (2004) Wczesnośredniowieczne pochówki antywampiryczne [w:] Hereditatem cognoscere. Studia i szkice dedykowane Profesor Marii Miśkiewicz, red. Kobyliński Zbigniew, Warszawa, s. 38-66.

Sanok County
Vampirism
Burials in Poland
Archaeological sites in Poland